(December 31, 1972March 19, 2015) was a Japanese screenwriter. He was famous for writing multiple anime series, most notably Darker than Black.

Biography
Suga was born in Tokyo, Japan. He worked in multiple series from Production I.G, including Blood+ and Ghost in the Shell: Stand Alone Complex. Suga recalls having problems with the latter's characters, most notably Motoko Kusanagi in regards to how their personalities work. Director Kenji Kamiyama often relied on Suga's work when working for such series. Despite the series' futuristic setting, Suga claimed that he aimed to give the audience modern themes to see in the anime.

Suga, the most important writer in the 2007 Darker than Black series, handles high concept and main plot related arc, with Hei on the spotlight. With Suga's control of the last few arcs, with the Doll selling as example, the stories starts to converge, and the ending is designed by Suga. For the 2010 original video animations Darker than Black: Gaiden Tensai Okamura gave Suga complete freedom and all he asked was that a scene with rain be put in. The scene plays in the third episode when Xin-Qi forces the Contractors to attack Hei.

Other works include Lagrange: The Flower of Rin-ne,My Youth Romantic Comedy Is Wrong, As I Expected (seasons 12), One Week Friends, The Seven Deadly Sins (season 1), and Dimension W. The Fandom Post considers Dimension W as a response to criticism aimed towards Darker than Black.

Suga also wrote the video games based movies from the Resident Evil games including Degeneration and Damnation. For the latter, Suga went to Eastern Europe and created East Slavic Republic, a fictional post-Soviet country formed following the dissolution of the Soviet Union. In retrospect, Suga claims that Damnation surpassed Degeneration.

Death
Suga died on March 19, 2015. The cause of his death was not disclosed.

Upon his death, Kenji Kamiyama wrote that he was glad he met Suga as he often helped him in his works and had a kind personality.

Notes

References

External links
 
 

1972 births
2015 deaths
People from Tokyo